is a Japanese variety show hosted by the Japanese owarai duo, Downtown. The show has been broadcast on TBS since 2014.

Overview 
In each episode, a Japanese entertainer is invited to appear on the show as a host and present various trivial theories, to a group of panellists. After a brief discussion with the panel, the theories are tested during the show.

Format 

Presentation of Theory

An entertainer (usually a comedian) appears to present a theory they think is true. This theory is challenged by the Wednesday Downtown via a re-enactment of the situation, a ranking based on street surveys or interviews.

Viewer's Theory

Theories submitted by viewers via the Wednesday Downtown official website are collected and presented by a representing comedian, usually Tamura Kenji.

Recurring Segments 
Dokkiri (Prank)

Theory that ropes unsuspecting celebrities (usually comedians) into a prank to see how they react. This kind of theory can range from being as elaborate as faking an arrest to being as simple as hiding in one's closet.

Kuro-chan

Mixed Battle

Monomane (Impersonation)

SASUKE

Past Segments 

Morning Battle

Two participants (comedians, usually Kuro-chan) are blindfolded and led to a shooting location where they will sleep for the night. The staff wakes them up promptly in the morning and the two immediately engage in a battle of the staff's choice (ex. eating hotdogs, shooting a goal, jumping hurdles)

Cast Members 
The panel always consists of Matsumoto and four other celebrity guests. The usual formation from left to right are "male comedian", "female tarento", "male tarento", "female tarento", Matsumoto.

Regular Members 

 Downtown
 Hamada Masatoshi - Host
 Matsumoto Hitoshi - Panel
 Jun Hattori - Narration

Frequently Appearing Members 
Often appearing as either panelist or presenters.
 Chidori
 Daigo
 Nobu
 Kazutoyo Koyabu
 Shigeo Takahashi (Savanna)
 Toshiaki Kasuga (Audrey)
 Daikichi Hakata (Hanamaru-Daikichi Hakata)
 Anthony (Matenrou)
 Giant Shirota
 Hironobu Komiya (Sanshiro)
 Kuro-chan (Yasuda Dai Circus)
 Jungle Pocket
 Tomoharu Shoji (Shinagawa Shoji)
 Tamura Kenji
 Viking
 Eiji Kotoge
 Mizuki Nishimura
 Akatsu
 Takahiro Ogata (Panther)
 Nadal (Colocolo Chikichiki Peppers)

See also 

 Knight Scoop (Similar premise, where members of the public ask 'detectives' to investigate certain problems)

External links 

 Wednesday's Downtown (TBS)
 Official Wednesday Downtown Twitter (@wed_downtown)
 Kuro-chan Twitter (@kurochan96wawa)
 Real Kuro-chan Twitter (@real_kurochan)
 Future Kuro-chan Twitter (@future_kurochan)

Japanese variety television shows
Japanese comedy television series
2014 Japanese television series debuts
TBS Television (Japan) original programming
2000s Japanese television series